Caterham Barracks was a military installation in Caterham, Surrey.

History
The barracks were built as a depot for the Foot Guards regiments in 1877. The construction reflected a more humane style of barrack design in the aftermath of the Crimean War; the barrack blocks included better sanitation as well as cross-ventilation and cross-lighting of sleeping facilities for the first time. A local public house (the Caterham Arms) which was frequented by soldiers was targeted by the IRA with a bomb injuring 23 civilians and 10 off-duty soldiers in August 1975. The barracks were closed in 1995 and the site was redeveloped for housing using urban village principles after planning consent was given in June 1990.

References

Installations of the British Army
Barracks in England